The impeachment inquiry against Andrew Johnson may refer to:
 First impeachment inquiry against Andrew Johnson
 Second impeachment inquiry against Andrew Johnson

See also
Efforts to impeach Andrew Johnson
Impeachment of Andrew Johnson
Impeachment trial of Andrew Johnson
1868 impeachment managers investigation
Timeline of the impeachment of Andrew Johnson